Aeschines of Neapolis (Gr. ; of modern Naples) was an Academic Skeptic who shared the leadership of the Academy at Athens together with Charmadas and Clitomachus about 110 BC, when Clitomachus was an old man.  Diogenes Laërtius says that he was a pupil and favourite of Melanthius of Rhodes.

References

Academic philosophers
Hellenistic-era philosophers in Athens
2nd-century BC philosophers